The 2015–16 BCHL season was the 54th season of the British Columbia Hockey League. (BCHL) The seventeen teams from the Interior, Island and Mainland divisions played 58-game schedules, featuring the 2015 BCHL Showcase, hosted in Chilliwack, shortly after the start of the season from September 24 to 27, 2015.

In March, the top teams from each division played for the Fred Page Cup, the BCHL Championship. The league champion then moved on to compete in the Western Canadian Junior A championship, the Western Canada Cup, in Estevan, Saskatchewan. If successful against the winners of the Alberta Junior Hockey League, Saskatchewan Junior Hockey League, Manitoba Junior Hockey League and the 2016 Western Canada Cup hosts, the Estevan Bruins, the champion and runner-up would then move on to play for the Canadian Junior Hockey League championship, the Royal Bank Cup, in Lloydmyinster, Saskatchewan

League changes
Wenatchee Wild joined the league from the North American Hockey League and began play in the Mainland Division.

Standings
Note:  GP = Games Played, W = Wins, L = Losses, T = Ties, OTL = Overtime Losses, Pts = Points

Standings listed on the official league website.

2015–16 BCHL Fred Page Cup Playoffs

Division playoffs

Semi-final Round Robin
The 2016 semifinal simplifies the double round robin concept with the "Three Wins To Get In" format. The first two teams to three wins advances to the final with the first team to reach three wins getting home ice advantage, while the remaining team is eliminated.

In case of a tie, the two tied teams will play a one game playoff to determine the second spot in the finals. In a three way tie, the teams will face off in a Page playoff format, starting with Chilliwack vs. West Kelowna. The loser of that game would play Nanaimo, and the winners from both games advance to the final.

{| cellpadding="1" width="340px" style="font-size: 90%; border: 1px solid gray;"
|- 
! style="background: #eeeeee;" width="25" |Team
! style="background: #eeeeee;" width="10" |Wins
|-
| Chilliwack || 3
|-
| West Kelowna || 3
|-
| Nanaimo || 2
|}

Fred Page Cup Final

2016 Western Canada Cup
The Fred Page Cup Champion West Kelowna Warriors advanced to the 2016 Western Canada Cup in Estevan, Saskatchewan where they will play for one of two spots in the 2016 Royal Bank Cup, where they finished first. They would go on to win the first national championship in franchise history.

Scoring Leaders
GP = Games Played, G = Goals, A = Assists, P = Points, PIM = Penalties In Minutes

Leading Goaltenders
Note: GP = Games Played, Mins = Minutes Played, W = Wins, L = Losses, T = Ties, GA = Goals Against, SO = Shutouts, Sv% = Save Percentage, GAA = Goals Against Average. Regulation losses and overtime losses have been combined for total losses.

Award Winners
Brett Hull Trophy (Top Scorer): Scott Conway (Penticton)
Best Defenceman: Dante Fabbro (Penticton)
Bruce Allison Memorial Trophy (Rookie of the Year): Vimal Sukumaran (Chilliwack)
Bob Fenton Trophy (Most Sportsmanlike): Colton Kerfoot (Coquitlam)
Top Goaltender: Zachary Driscoll (Penticton)
Wally Forslund Memorial Trophy (Best Goaltending Duo): Zachary Driscoll & Anthony Brodeur (Penticton)
Vern Dye Memorial Trophy (regular-season MVP):  Tyson Jost (Penticton)
Joe Tennant Memorial Trophy (Coach of the Year): Fred Harbinson (Penticton)
Ron Boileau Memorial Trophy (Best Regular Season Record): Penticton Vees
Fred Page Cup (League Champions): West Kelowna Warriors

Players Selected in 2016 NHL Entry Draft
 Rd1: 10 Tyson Jost: Colorado Avalanche (Penticton Vees)
 Rd1: 17 Dante Fabbro: Nashville Predators (Penticton Vees)
 Rd1: 20 Dennis Cholowski: Detroit Red Wings (Chilliwack Chiefs)

See also
2015 in ice hockey
2016 in ice hockey

References

External links
Official Website of the British Columbia Hockey League
Official Website of the Canadian Junior Hockey League

BCHL
British Columbia Hockey League seasons